Muránska Dlhá Lúka is a village and municipality in Revúca District in the Banská Bystrica Region of Slovakia.

References

External links
 
 
https://web.archive.org/web/20160731080853/http://muranskadlhaluka.e-obce.sk/

Villages and municipalities in Revúca District